Fusion Arena is the placeholder name for a planned multi-use facility located in Philadelphia, Pennsylvania. Announced on March 25, 2019, the original plan for the venue was to be a dedicated esports arena as the home to the Philadelphia Fusion of the Overwatch League (OWL). It was originally planned to open prior to the 2021 OWL season.

Construction is currently paused due to the COVID-19 pandemic.

History 
On December 12, 2018, the Overwatch League (OWL), an esports league based on Blizzard Entertainment's 2016 first-person shooter Overwatch, announced the addition of "Homestand Weeks," weeks of games played in cities other than Burbank, California, where all 2018 OWL games were played, for their second season as an effort to push the league towards a full home-and-away schedule. On March 15, 2019, then-OWL commissioner Nate Nanzer tweeted that all teams would have home venues for the 2020 season. On March 25, Comcast Spectacor announced plans to build Fusion Arena, the "largest new-construction, purpose-built esports arena in the Western Hemisphere," adjacent to Xfinity Live!. Fusion Arena was subsequently added to Comcast's $250 million "Transformation 2020" project, a project to renovate the South Philadelphia Sports Complex, which includes Xfinity Live!, Lincoln Financial Field, Wells Fargo Center, Citizens Bank Park, and the surrounding area.

A groundbreaking ceremony was held on September 25, days before the 2019 Overwatch League Grand Finals took place at the Wells Fargo Center. OWL commissioner Pete Vlastelica, Philadelphia mayor Jim Kenney, Fusion players and representatives of Comcast Spectacor participated in the ceremony.

On September 21, 2020, Comcast Spectacor announced a pause in construction caused by the COVID-19 pandemic and that the opening of the arena would likely be delayed. In June 2022, Philadelphia Business Journal reported that Comcast Spectacor changed its plans from having it be a dedicated esports arena into a multi-use facility.

Planning and design 
Conceptual images for Fusion Arena were released on March 25, 2019. The  arena will be built on  next to Xfinity Live! on 11th Street in the South Philadelphia Sports Complex. The arena will be constructed by Populous. The arena will have two balcony bars, seats with USB ports, boxes and suites. It is expected to hold 3,500 people.  will be used for a training facility, broadcast studio and team offices.

References

External links 

 

South Philadelphia
Philadelphia Fusion
Esports venues in Pennsylvania